Cesium telluride or Caesium telluridocaesium is an inorganic salt with a chemical formula Cs2Te. Caesium telluride is used to make photo cathodes. 

Cesium telluride is the photoemissive material used in many laser-driven radio frequency (RF) electron guns like in the TESLA Test Facility (TTF).

Production

References 

Caesium compounds
Tellurides